Burlington SC may refer to:

 Burlington SC (League1 Ontario), a Canadian semi-professional soccer team
 Burlington SC (Canadian Soccer League), a former Canadian semi-professional soccer team currently known as Halton United